Francis Winnington (1704 – c.1754) of Broadway was an English politician and barrister.

Francis was the son of Francis Winnington of Broadway, the second son of Sir Francis Winnington. He matriculated at Trinity College, Oxford on 29 March 1721, at the age of 17, and was called to the bar at the Middle Temple on 9 February 1728. From 1733 to 1747, he was Solicitor to the Admiralty, before resigning the post to enter Parliament.

He sat as MP for Droitwich from 1747 to 1754. His marriage to Susannah Courtney or Courtenay left no children. His brother was Edward Winnington and his nephew Sir Edward Winnington, 1st Baronet.

References

1704 births
1750s deaths
Alumni of Trinity College, Oxford
Members of the Middle Temple
Members of the Parliament of Great Britain for English constituencies
People from Wychavon (district)
18th-century English people
British MPs 1747–1754